Floyd Turner, Jr. (born May 29, 1966) is a former professional American football wide receiver in the National Football League. He played nine seasons for New Orleans Saints (1989–1993), the Indianapolis Colts (1994–1995), and the Baltimore Ravens (1996, 1998). After his playing days ended, Turner was involved in a check laundering scheme that stole over 12 million dollars from Bank One.

Turner wore number 88 with the Colts just before the arrival of Marvin Harrison. He wore number 87 with the Baltimore Ravens.

1966 births
Living people
Players of American football from Shreveport, Louisiana
American football wide receivers
Northwestern State Demons football players
Indianapolis Colts players
New Orleans Saints players
Baltimore Ravens players
American money launderers